Mukomuko Airport  is the main airport serving the city of Mukomuko, Indonesia. The airport has flights operated by Wings Air of Indonesia to Bengkulu in Indonesia. The airport is owned by Government of Indonesia and operated by Unit Penyelenggara Bandar Udara.

Terminals and facilities
The airport has one terminal for passengers departing from or arriving into the airport.

Airlines and destinations

References

Airports in Sumatra
Buildings and structures in Bengkulu